Calliphaula leucippe is a species of beetle in the family Cerambycidae. It was described by Bates in 1881.

References

Aerenicini
Beetles described in 1881